This topic covers notable events and articles related to 2011 in music.

Specific locations
2011 in American music
2011 in Asian music 
2011 in British music
2011 in Canadian music
2011 in European music (Continental Europe)
2011 in Irish music
2011 in Japanese music
2011 in Norwegian music
2011 in South Korean music
2011 in Swedish music

Specific genres 
2011 in classical music
2011 in country music
2011 in heavy metal music
2011 in hip hop music
2011 in jazz
2011 in Latin music
2011 in opera
2011 in rock music

Albums released

Deaths 

 January
 29 – Milton Babbitt (94), American jazz composer, music theorist, and teacher.

 February
 3 – Eline Nygaard Riisnæs (87), Norwegian pianist and musicologist.
 14 – George Shearing (91), British jazz pianist.
 22 – Beau Dollar (69), American soul-R&B singer and drummer.

March
 29 – Ray Herr (63), American rock guitarist (The Ides of March).

 April
 10 – Børt-Erik Thoresen (79), Norwegian television host and folk singer.
 22 – Eyvind Solås (74), Norwegian musician, composer, actor, and program host.
 24 – Dag Stokke (44), Norwegian keyboardist in the band TNT, church organist and mastering engineer (cancer).
 26 – Phoebe Snow (60), American jazz singer, songwriter, and guitarist.

 May
 14 – Don Wood (61), American rock drummer (The Gants)
 15 – Bob Flanigan (84), American jazz tenor vocalist and founding member of The Four Freshmen.
 31 – Sølvi Wang (81), Norwegian singer and actress.

 June
 3 – Andrew Gold (59), American singer, songwriter, musician and arranger

 July
 23 – Amy Winehouse (27), English rock, soul and jazz singer, and songwriter.
 24 – Harald Johnsen (41), Norwegian bassist (heart attack).
 26 – Frank Foster (82), American tenor and soprano saxophonist, flautist, arranger, and composer. 

 August
 11 – Jani Lane (47), American metal singer and songwriter  (Warrant).

 September
 4 – Hilde Heltberg (51), singer songwriter (cancer).
 7 – Eddie Marshall (73), American drummer.
 19 – Johnny Răducanu (79), Romanian pianist.
 21 – John Larson (61), American trumpeter (The Ides of March).

 October
 8 – Roger Williams (87), American pianist.

 November
 19 – Russell Garcia (95), American composer and music arranger.
 22 – Paul Motian (80), American guitarist.

 December
 2 – Bill Tapia (103), American guitarist.
 17 – Cesária Évora (70), Cape Verdean singer.
 20 – Sean Bonniwell (71), American rock singer-songwriter and guitarist (The Music Machine).

See also 

 List of Single Top 100 number-one singles of 2011
 Timeline of musical events
 Women in music
 2011 in television

References

 
2011-related lists
Music by year